Butterfill is a British surname.

People with the surname 

 John Butterfill (born 1941), British politician
 Stephen Butterfill,  British philosopher and professor

See also 

 Butterfly

Surnames
English-language surnames
Surnames of English origin
Surnames of British Isles origin